Angus Gilmour (born 5 August 1990)  is a Scottish male badminton player.

Achievements

BWF International Challenge/Series
Men's Doubles

 BWF International Challenge tournament
 BWF International Series tournament
 BWF Future Series tournament

References

External links

 

1990 births
Living people
Scottish male badminton players